Tishma is a pop rock singer, songwriter, rapper, pianist, guitarist, musician, music composer and music producer in the U.S.A Bangladesh. She's the first Bangladeshi Hollywood celebrity. She is also known as the "Rock Princess of Bangladesh" by fans. She plays a variety of musical instruments such as piano, guitar, keyboard, and drums, and is Bangladesh's first and only female music composer and music producer. She is an innovator in Bangladeshi popular music and is noted for introducing changes in the pop music arena in her country.

Career
, Tishma has released fifteen solo albums. Tishma made her debut as a child artist with her album Tara in late December 2002. From then on, Tishma has worked with other music genres, such as R&B, ballads, and funk.

In 2011, Tishma's album Xperiment came out. The next year, she released Xperiment ReloadeD, and in 2013, she released Hypnotized. In 2014, Tishma released her next solo album, Rockstar. A documentary video album of Tishma named The Rock Princess – Xposed, was released in 2013 or 2014. In 2015, she released MesmerizeD, which contains both English and Bangla tracks. In 2016, Tishma's thirteenth solo album, Royalty, was released. From this album, "Mone Mone Tomake Bhalobashi Mone Hoe" was released as a single in the same year.

Following 'Royalty' in 2016, Tishma next released two more of her own written and composed solo albums titled 'X' (2018) and '2020' (2020) respectively. It is currently not yet known when her upcoming new album will be released.

Education and biography
Tishma spent a large part of her early childhood in various parts of Europe, beginning her formal education in the UK.

Originally a classically trained musician, Tishma began her musical education at a very early age; she was playing piano by age four, and studied European classical music and music theory under ABRSM. She also received talim (musical education) in Indian classical music and later studied Tagore songs and folk music. She has released songs in a variety of genres such as rock, Bangla folk, opera, rap, classical, experimental, alternative, Nazrul, Rabindra Sangeet and Adhunik.

Alongside having released most of her albums while in school, Tishma has 10 A's in O levels (in one sitting) and 5 A's in A levels. In 2014, she took a break from music production to attend college to study engineering.

Discography

Albums
 Tara (2002) (due to the release time late in the year, sometimes Tishma's album is often listed as a 2003 release)
 Chand (2003)
 Shurjo (2004)
 Baula Prem (2005)
 Sham Rakhi Na Kul Rakhi (2006)
 Matir Putul (2006)
 Cholonar Daba (2007)
 X-Factor (2008)
 Xperiment (2011)
 XoXo (Xperiment ReLoadeD) (2012)
 Hypnotized (2013)
 Rockstar (2014)
 Mesmerized (2015) 
 Royalty (2016) 
 X (2018) 
 2020 (2020)

Video albums
 2003 – Pop Queen
 2003 – Bashiwallah
 2003 – Chand
 2004 – Digi Digi Dum Dum
 2004 – Best of Tishma
 2005 – Sham Rakhi Na Kul Rakhi
 2005 – Deewana
 2005 – Prem
 2006 – Matir Putul
 2006 – Neel Chokh
 2007 – Chander Meye Josna
 2008 – Mega Hitz of Tishma
 2009 – Rock Rajkonna
 2010 – Projapoti
 2014 – The Rock Princess – Xposed (musical documentary)

References

External links
 Official Website of Tishma 

21st-century Bangladeshi women singers
21st-century Bangladeshi singers
Bangladeshi music directors
Bangladeshi composers
Bangladeshi lyricists
Living people
Year of birth missing (living people)